Alexander Williamson Dick (30 November 1922 – 31 January 2018) was an Australian cricketer who played one first-class match for Western Australia in 1949. He played his only match against Victoria, scoring a duck batting at number eight in the first innings and eight runs batting at number nine in the second innings. He took 0/11 off of four overs in Victoria's first innings bowling right-arm fast-medium. Born in Boulder, he was the brother of Ian Dick, who captained Australia at field hockey at the 1956 Summer Olympics in Melbourne, and the nephew of Billy Dick, who captained  to the 1914 VFL premiership.

References

External links

1922 births
2018 deaths
Australian cricketers
People educated at Wesley College, Perth
People from Boulder, Western Australia
Western Australia cricketers
Cricketers from Western Australia